A lullaby or lullabye is a soothing song, sung most often to children before sleep.

Lullaby or lullabye may also refer to:

Film and TV 
The Lullaby (1924 film), an American silent film directed by Chester Bennett
Lullaby (1937 film), a Soviet documentary directed by Dziga Vertov
The Lullaby (1958 film), a South Korean film starring Jeon Ok
Lullaby (2005 film), an Israeli documentary by Adi Arbel
Lullaby (2008 film), a South African drama directed by Darrell Roodt
Lullaby (2010 film), a Polish comedy film directed by Juliusz Machulski
Lullaby (2014 film), an American drama directed by Andrew Levitas
Lullaby (2022 film), a Spanish drama directed by Alauda Ruiz de Azúa

Television
"Lullaby", January 18, 1960 episode of American series The Play of the Week#Season 1 (1959–60)
"Lullaby" (Angel), November 19, 2001 episode of American series Angel

Literature 
"Lullaby", 1980 French short story in Mondo and Other Stories#Contents and themes by J. M. G. Le Clézio
Lullaby (Palahniuk novel), 2002 American horror-satire
Lullaby (Atkins novel), 2012 continuation of American detective Spenser novels
Lullaby (Slimani novel), 2016 French psychological thriller

Music

Classical compositions 
Lullaby (Колыбельная) Russian song by Mussorgsky
Lullaby for piano  by Tchaikovsky
 "Berceuse" (Chopin), "cradle song", composed by Frédéric Chopin
 Wiegenlied, Op. 49 No. 4 "Brahms's Lullaby" by Johannes Brahms
 "Sandmännchen", WoO.31-4, another lullaby by Johannes Brahms
Lullaby Cyril Scott (1879-1970)
Lullabies, by Josef Suk (1874-1935)

Musical theatre
 Lullabye (musical), 1983–84

Albums 
 Lullabies (EP), a 1982 EP by Cocteau Twins
 Lullaby (Book of Love album), 1988
 Lullaby (Celtic Woman album), 2011
 Lullaby (James Walsh album), 2012
 Lullaby (Jewel album), 2009
 Lullaby (Kate Ceberano and Nigel MacLean album), 2015
 Lullaby (Sophie Barker album), 2005
 Lullaby EP, by Taking Back Sunday
 Lullaby, by If Thousands, 2002
 Lullaby, U.S. title of Julian Lloyd Webber's album Cradle Song

Songs 
 "Lullaby" (Beatles song) from Abbey Road, 1969
 "Lullaby" (Book of Love song), 1988
 "Lullaby" (The Cure song), 1989
 "Lullaby" (Professor Green song), 2014
 "Lullaby" (Melanie Brown song), 2001
 "Lullaby" (Nickelback song), 2011
 "Lullaby" (Shawn Mullins song), 1998
 "Lullaby" (Sigala and Paloma Faith song), 2018
 "Lullaby" (Starsailor song), 2001
 "Lullaby" (The Tea Party song), 2001
 "Lullaby", by Alice Cooper from the album The Last Temptation
 "Lullaby", by Blackfield from the album Blackfield I
 "Lullaby", by Brotherhood of Man from the album Images
 "Lullaby", by Cubic U (Hikaru Utada) from the album Precious
 "Lullaby", by Dixie Chicks from the album Taking the Long Way
 "Lullaby", by Got7 from the album Present: You
 "Lullaby", by Hayden from the album Skyscraper National Park
 "Lullaby", by James from the album Laid
 "Lullaby", by Lagwagon from the album Blaze
 "Lullaby", by Leonard Cohen from the album Old Ideas
 "Lullaby", by Lit from the album Lit
 "Lullaby", by Loreena McKennitt from the album Elemental
 "Lullaby", by Low from the album I Could Live in Hope
 "Lullaby", by Matt Costa from the album The Elasmosaurus EP
 "Lullaby", by Newton Faulkner from the album Hand Built by Robots
 "Lullaby", by Olivia Newton-John from the album If Not for You
 "Lullaby", by OneRepublic from the album Waking Up
 "Lullaby", by Pedro the Lion from the EP Whole
 "Lullaby", by A Perfect Circle from the album Thirteenth Step
 "Lullaby", by Reef from the album Glow
 "Lullaby", by Sia from the album Some People Have Real Problems
 "Lullaby", by The Spill Canvas from the album No Really, I'm Fine
 "Lullaby", by Stephen Lynch from the album A Little Bit Special
 "Lullaby", by Thrice from the album Vheissu
 "Lullaby", by Ween from the album La Cucaracha
 "Lullaby", by Zebra from the album No Tellin' Lies
 "Lullaby", from the musical Shock Treatment
 "Lullabye (Goodnight, My Angel)", by Billy Joel
 "Lullabye", by Ben Folds from the album The Unauthorized Biography of Reinhold Messner
 "Lullabye", by Fall Out Boy, a hidden track from the album Folie à Deux
 "Lullabye", by Kevin Ayers from the album Whatevershebringswesing
 "The Lullaby Song", by Kevin Roth from the Shining Time Station episode "Mr. Conductor's Big Sleepwalk"
 "Berceuse", by Celine Dion from the album D'elles
 "Lullaby", by Todrick Hall featuring Brandy from the album Forbidden
 "Lullaby", the premiere music video (2015) from Niykee Heaton

See also